
Gmina Gromadka is a rural gmina (administrative district) in Bolesławiec County, Lower Silesian Voivodeship, in southwestern Poland.

Neighbouring gminas
Gmina Gromadka is bordered by the gminas of Bolesławiec, Chocianów, Chojnów, Przemków, Szprotawa and Warta Bolesławiecka.

Villages
The gmina contains the villages of Borówki, Gromadka, Krzyżowa, Modła, Motyle, Nowa Kuźnia, Osła, Pasternik, Patoka, Różyniec and Wierzbowa.

See also
 LGBT ideology-free zone

References

Gromadka
Bolesławiec County